Guerau IV de Cabrera (1196–1229) was a claimant to the County of Urgel during the time that James I of Aragon was King of Aragon. His uncle, Ponç III of Cabrera, married the daughter of Ermengol VII named Marquesa in 1194. Also, Marquesa’s father, Ermengol VII, was the son of Ermengol VI and his first wife, Arsenda of Cabrera. Through these familial ties to the House of Cabrera, Gerau came to claim the County of Urgell.

In 1208 with the death of Armengol VIII Guerau claimed that Armengol's daughter, Aurembiaix, could not inherit the land and so he should be made the ruler of the County.  Aurembiax's mother, Elvira, was able to maintain control of the county until her death in 1220.  In that year Guerau took control of the county of Urgell as Guerau I.

Guerau was forced out of Urgel in 1228 and the land was put under the rule of Aurembiaix due to circumstances outside of his control. He remained Guerau IV, vicount of Cabrera and Guerau III, viscount of Ager. The death of Aurembiaix and himself the following year allowed other relatives to begin control. His son by Elo Perez de Castro became Guerau V, viscount de Cabrera, but control of the viscounty of Ager was consolidated with the county of Urgell under Aurembiaix's second husband Peter I, Count of Urgell. In 1236 his younger son Ponce became Ponce I, Count of Urgell, and Viscount of Ager, and in 1243 became Ponce IV de Cabrera, thus consolidating administration of the lands as Guerau IV envisioned.

References
Chaytor, H. J. A History of Aragon and Catalonia. London: Methuen, 1933.

13th-century people from the Kingdom of Aragon
Counts of Urgell